John Waldegrave may refer to:

 John Waldegrave (Royal Navy officer) (1905–1944), British naval commander during World War II
 John Waldegrave, 3rd Earl Waldegrave (1718–1784), British politician and soldier
 John Waldegrave, 6th Earl Waldegrave (1785–1835), British peer and soldier